Spanish Flat is an unincorporated community in El Dorado County, California.

A post office operated at Spanish Flat from 1853 to 1872 and for a while in 1888. The name commemorates Spanish-speaking miners at the site.

References

Unincorporated communities in California
Unincorporated communities in El Dorado County, California
Spanish-American culture in California